Dovey Junction railway station   is a railway station on the Cambrian Line in Wales. Passenger services are provided by Transport for Wales. There is a single island platform.

The station is in Powys, about  NE of the junction of three counties: the current principal areas of Ceredigion, Powys and Gwynedd, corresponding to the traditional counties of Cardiganshire, Montgomeryshire and Merionethshire.

The station is in the midst of the large Dyfi National Nature Reserve, near the Cardigan Bay coast. There is no settlement here but, contrary to common belief, it is not completely isolated: a  footpath provides passenger access to and from the hamlet of Glandyfi in Ceredigion, and to a main road (the A487).

History
The station was opened in 1863 as Glandovey Junction. It was renamed Dovey Junction in 1904.

The station has been rebuilt twice in recent years: the original Cambrian Railways buildings were first replaced in the 1970s by a flat-roofed station building. This building was subsequently replaced in the 1990s by a simple bus shelter, having fallen into a state of disrepair and being far larger than required at this remote location.

The station platforms were raised in 2008 in conjunction with raising of the tracks, to reduce the likelihood of closure of this section of line due to flooding. The work was part of a major programme of work on the Cambrian Line, including ERTMS signalling to replace the previous RETB system and an extended (dynamic) passing loop at Welshpool to permit running an hourly service from Shrewsbury-Aberystwyth in the future.

Dovey Junction is often quoted as a defining feature of the Great Western Railway in Wales: its inheritance of junctions in unlikely and inconvenient locations. Other examples are Moat Lane Junction, Talyllyn Junction, Afon Wen and Barmouth Junction (renamed Morfa Mawddach in 1960).

Services
Trains call at least every two hours in each direction throughout the day (Mon–Sat), rising to once an hour during the morning and afternoon peaks and into the early evening.

On Sundays, there is a 2-hourly service between Shrewsbury and Aberystwyth all year, plus 3 trains each way in summer to/from Pwllheli but just a single train each way in the winter months.

References

Further reading

External links

Railway stations in Powys
DfT Category F2 stations
Former Cambrian Railway stations
Railway stations in Great Britain opened in 1863
Railway stations served by Transport for Wales Rail
Rail junctions in Wales
Railway stations in Great Britain without road access
Cadfarch
Glandyfi